Indradhanush is a 2000 Indian Kannada-language action drama film directed, written and scored by V. Manohar and produced by Poornima S Babu. The film stars Shiva Rajkumar, Monal, Akanksha Tripathi and Hari Nayar. The film released on 31 March 2000 and was a box office failure.

Cast 
 Shiva Rajkumar 
 Monal
 Akanksha Tripathi
 Gurukiran
 Hari Nayar
 Avinash
 M.N Lakshmi Devi
 Guru Kiran
 Sundeep Malani
 Sudhakar Banannje
 Charulatha...special appearance

Soundtrack 
The soundtrack of the film was composed by V. Manohar.

References

External links 
 
preview at Online Bangalore

2000 films
2000s Kannada-language films
Indian action drama films
Films scored by V. Manohar
2000 action films